Millington is an unincorporated community in Albemarle County, Virginia.

Midway was added to the National Register of Historic Places in 1979.

References

Unincorporated communities in Virginia
Unincorporated communities in Albemarle County, Virginia